() is a Japanese insurance holdings company. It is listed on the Nikkei 225.

The firm is considered one of three top insurers in Japan.

See also 
 Sompo Japan Nipponkoa

References

External links 
 

Japanese brands
Companies listed on the Tokyo Stock Exchange
Companies listed on the Osaka Exchange
Insurance companies based in Tokyo
Japanese companies established in 2001
Financial services companies established in 2001
Holding companies based in Tokyo
Holding companies established in 2001